Penikese Island is a  island off the coast of Massachusetts, United States, in Buzzards Bay. It is one of the Elizabeth Islands, which make up the town of Gosnold, Massachusetts.  Penikese is located near the west end of the Elizabeth island chain.

History

Penikese Island entered the historical record in 1602 AD when the English explorer Bartholomew Gosnold and some of his crew visited the island. Their visit frightened four visiting Wampanoag Indians into hiding, and the explorers stole their canoe.

Originally tree covered, at some later time the tree cover was lost, and the island was later used for pasturing sheep.  To this day, it remains primarily grass covered.  Ownership changed hands several times before the island was purchased by John Anderson, a businessman, who used it for vacationing.

In early 1873, Louis Agassiz, the famous Swiss-American naturalist, persuaded Anderson to give him the island and $50,000 to endow a school for natural history where students would study nature instead of books. The school opened in July 1873, initially headed by Louis Agassiz. Following his death in December, his son Alexander Agassiz ran the school. The school was closed following a fire in 1875, but some of the former students opened in 1888 the Marine Biological Laboratory, in nearby Woods Hole.

In 1904, following local opposition to two previously selected sites on the mainland, the state of Massachusetts purchased the island for $25,000 to use as a leprosy hospital to isolate and treat all Massachusetts residents with the disease. When opened, the Penikese Island Leper Hospital had five patients. After being open for 16 years, it was closed in 1921 and the thirteen patients were transferred to the federal leprosy hospital in Carville, Louisiana. At the closing of the hospital, the state burnt and then dynamited the buildings, and all that remains of it are stone gate posts and a small cemetery.

The island remains under the ownership of the Commonwealth of Massachusetts and is primarily a bird sanctuary. There is no permanent population on the island. A residential school for troubled boys operated on the island from 1973 until 2011.  There may also be visitors and researchers on island from time to time, as the island is publicly owned and is still used at times for biological research.  Beginning in 1990, the island was used as a test site for efforts to reintroduce the endangered American burying beetle, which appears to have succeeded; by 1997 the population had persisted for at least five generations since the last release.

Penikese Island Long-Term Treatment Center 

In the fall of 2015, a long-term opioid-addiction treatment facility named Penikese began operation on the island. According to several newspapers, the treatment center shut down in 2017 after a lack of funding.

References

External links
 The Penikese Island School website
 Cuttyhunk Historical Society, the Museum of the Elizabeth Islands

Defunct hospitals in Massachusetts
Elizabeth Islands
Leper colonies
Coastal islands of Massachusetts
Populated coastal places in Massachusetts